Peachia is a genus of sea anemone in the family Haloclavidae. Members of this genus typically burrow into soft substrates. The only part of the animal that is normally visible is the oral disc and tentacles which lie flat on the sand in a star shape. The type species is Peachia cylindrica (Reid, 1848).

Characteristics
Members of the genus Peachia have a rounded base called the "physa" with tiny perforations, a tall column called the "scapus" and a delicate upper region called the "capitulum". The "siphonoglyph", a ciliated groove, is elongated and partially separated from the tubular throat, the "actinopharynx". There is a lobed projection called a "conchula", unique to this genus, at the entrance to the siphonoglyph. There are twelve, flattened tentacles. Six of the pairs of mesenteries dividing the internal body cavity are perfect while the other four are imperfect, with powerful retractor muscles. There is no sphincter muscle. The larvae are parasitic on medusae.

Species
The following species are listed in the World Register of Marine Species:

Peachia boeckii (Danielssen & Koren, 1856)
Peachia carnea Hutton, 1879
Peachia chilensis Carlgren, 1931
Peachia cylindrica (Reid, 1848)
Peachia hilli Wilsmore, 1911
Peachia koreni McMurrich, 1893
Peachia mira Carlgren, 1943
Peachia neozealandica Carlgren, 1924
Peachia parasitica (Agassiz, 1859)
Peachia quinquecapitata McMurrich, 1913
Peachia taeniata Klunzinger, 1877

References

Haloclavidae
Taxa named by Philip Henry Gosse